Gary Springer Sr. (born February 18, 1962) is an American former professional basketball player who is best known for his collegiate career at Iona College between 1980–81 and 1983–84.

Springer grew up in Harlem, New York and attended Benjamin Franklin High School (BFHS). He played on a dominant basketball team with the likes of Richie Adams, Kenny Hutchinson and Lonnie Green, all of whom were jointly credited with making BFHS the country's top-ranked team in the fall of 1979. Walter Berry then joined the team one year later, making it possibly one of the greatest New York City high school teams of all time.

After high school, Springer played basketball for the Iona Gaels. Springer went on to earn varsity letters all four years at the school and graduated as one of its most lauded players. He compiled 1,866 points and 1,021 rebounds in his 121-game career. Additionally, Springer was a three-time honorable mention All-American, a three-time All-Metro Atlantic Athletic Conference selection, a four-time All-Metropolitan Area choice, and as a freshman in 1980–81 he was the Haggerty Award winner. The annual award is bestowed upon the New York City metropolitan area's most outstanding men's college basketball player.

During one week in his freshman season, he recorded totals of 58 points, 23 rebounds, and made two game-winning shots. His first shot was a buzzer-beater to defeat Wagner, 82–80, followed by a 20-foot shot with six seconds remaining to defeat Holy Cross, 57–56. For his efforts, Sports Illustrated named him their national player of the week.

The Gaels also reached the postseason three out of his four seasons. They reached the first round in the 1982 NIT, the second round in the 1983 NIT, and the round of 48 in the 1984 NCAA Tournament. After his collegiate career, Springer was drafted by the NBA's Philadelphia 76ers, but never played in the NBA due to injuries.

Springer has three sons, Gary Jr., who also later starred at Iona in the mid-2000s, Jordan played at Army in the early 2010s and Jaden, his youngest son, played for Tennessee and was the 28th overall pick in the 2021 NBA Draft by the Philadelphia 76ers. His nephew is NBA player DeAndre' Bembry.

References

1962 births
Living people
American men's basketball players
Basketball players from New York City
Iona Gaels men's basketball players
Parade High School All-Americans (boys' basketball)
Philadelphia 76ers draft picks
Power forwards (basketball)
Puerto Rico Coquis players
Sportspeople from Manhattan